The  is a railway line in Nara Prefecture, Japan, operated by the private railway operator Kintetsu Railway. All Express and Limited Express trains continue to and from Ōsaka Abenobashi Station on the Minami Osaka Line.

History

The  Co. opened the Yoshino - Muda section in 1912, and extended the line to Kashiharajingū-mae in 1923, electrifying the entire line at 1500 VDC at that time. Amongst the rolling stock were three Bo'Bo' goodtrain locomotives delivered from Brown, Boveri & Cie in Switzerland.

In 1929 the company merged with the Osaka Electric Railway Co., which merged with Kintetsu in 1944.

Freight services ceased in 1984, and CTC signalling was commissioned in 2001.

Kintetsu Railway introduced the Blue Symphony sight-seeing train on this line in 2018. The special train runs twice a day in both directions.

Stations
 O: stop,
 |: pass
 (Express trains, local trains, and semi-express trains stop at every station.)

References
This article incorporates material from the corresponding article in the Japanese Wikipedia

Rail transport in Nara Prefecture
Yohino Line
1067 mm gauge railways in Japan
Railway lines opened in 1912
1912 establishments in Japan